Singles is the soundtrack album of the 1992 film Singles, released on June 30, 1992, almost three months before the film. It is primarily focused on the ascendant Seattle grunge scene of the early 1990s, but also features contributions from past Seattle artists Jimi Hendrix and The Lovemongers (Heart's Ann and Nancy Wilson, the latter of whom was the wife of the film's director Cameron Crowe at the time), Chicago's The Smashing Pumpkins, and the first solo material from Minneapolis' Paul Westerberg after the breakup of The Replacements.

The album has been certified two times platinum by the RIAA, indicating sales of at least two million copies in the United States. In April 2019, it was ranked No. 19 on Rolling Stone's "50 Greatest Grunge Albums" list.

A Deluxe Edition of the album featuring a bonus disc with 18 additional tracks was released on May 19, 2017, one day after the death of Soundgarden frontman Chris Cornell, whose music is featured prominently on the soundtrack and who has a cameo in the film; this was only a coincidence, as the album's release date had been announced in January. Songs used in the movie, but not included on either edition of the soundtrack, are: "Three Days" by Jane's Addiction, "Little Girl" by Muddy Waters, "Dig for Fire" by the Pixies, "Radio Song" by R.E.M., "Blue Train" by John Coltrane, "Family Affair" by Sly & The Family Stone, "She Sells Sanctuary" by The Cult, and "Jinx" by Tad.

Impact
The soundtrack is considered to have helped open the door to the explosive popularity of Seattle grunge in the early 1990s. According to Steve Huey of AllMusic, "Singles helped crystallize the idea of the 'Seattle scene' in the mainstream public's mind, and it was also one of the first big-selling '90s movie soundtracks (it went platinum and reached the Top Ten) to feature largely new work from contemporary artists ... it's a milestone in the breakthrough of alternative rock into mainstream popular culture, neatly and effectively packaging the Seattle phenomenon for the wider national consciousness."

Deluxe Edition
On May 19, 2017, a remastered Deluxe Edition of the album was released to commemorate the original album's 25th anniversary. In addition to the original 13-song soundtrack on either one CD or two LPs, this release included new liner notes and track-by-track descriptions by Cameron Crowe and a bonus CD consisting of 18 additional tracks. The bonus material included a track each from Truly and Blood Circus, live tracks by Alice in Chains and Soundgarden that were recorded during their performances in the film, and demos and instrumentals by Mudhoney, Paul Westerberg, Chris Cornell, and members of Pearl Jam. Of these tracks, seven were previously-unreleased, and five had never been released on CD. Also included is "Touch Me I'm Dick" by Matt Dillon’s fictional band in the film, Citizen Dick, which was recorded by Pearl Jam's Eddie Vedder, Stone Gossard, and Jeff Ament.

Track listing

 In addition to later recording "Spoon Man" with Soundgarden (as "Spoonman") and "Flutter Girl" on his debut solo album, Chris Cornell reused the lyrics of the first two verses and bridge of "Ferry Boat #3" in the song "The Curse" on Audioslave's 2005 album Out of Exile.

Certifications

References

External links
Soundtrack Credits on IMDb

1992 soundtrack albums
Grunge soundtracks
Alternative rock soundtracks
Epic Records soundtracks
Romance film soundtracks
Comedy film soundtracks